Příbram VI-Březové Hory (until 1953 Březové Hory) is a town part of Příbram in the Central Bohemian Region of the Czech Republic. Until 1953, it was a separate town. It is known as a former royal mining town.

Etymology
The name literally means "Birch Mountains".

Geography
The Litavka River partially forms the border with Podlesí.

History
The first evidence of silver mining in Březové Hory dates from the 14th century. At the beginning of the 16th century a mining settlement was established near the silver-ore mines, it was promoted to a market town in the 18th century. It reached its greatest fame at the turn of the 18th and 19th centuries, when five underground mines were gradually open. The volume of mined silver then reached up to 97% of all mined silver in the Austro-Hungarian monarchy and Březové Hory became the main silver producer in Europe. This is one of the reasons why the town was promoted to a royal mining town on 20 April 1896 by Emperor Franz Joseph I.

Since the beginning of the 20th century there has been a gradual decline in mining, but thanks to the state subsidies mining continued until 1978. In 1953 Březové Hory became part of Příbram. After mining was terminated, several mining buildings were converted to Mining Museum Příbram. It is the largest mining museum in the Czech Republic.

Cultural monuments
In Březové Hory there are many preserved mines and other buildings designated as the Czech cultural monuments, some of them are on the national cultural monument list.

Miner's House
Portal of Ševčiny transportation adit – national cultural monument
Portal of Marie transportation adit – national cultural monument
Mining Inspectorate
Administrative building – Mine engineering
Church of St. Procopius
Mining office building, also called "Šichtamt"
Ševčiny Mine – national cultural monument
Anna Mine – national cultural monument
Adalbert Mine – national cultural monument
Church of St. Adalbert

Gallery

References

Příbram
Mining communities in the Czech Republic
Neighbourhoods in the Czech Republic